Hrušovany nad Jevišovkou is a town in Znojmo District in the South Moravian Region of the Czech Republic. It has about 3,200 inhabitants.

Geography
It lies in the Dyje–Svratka Valley. It is situated on the left bank of the Jevišovka River. A small southern part of the municipal border is formed by the river Thaya, which is also the state border with Austria.

History
The first written mention of Hrušovany nad Jevišovkou is in a deed of bishop Jindřich Zdík from 1141. The settlement was promoted to a town in 1495 by King Vladislaus II. During the rule of Counts of Khuen-Belassi in the 19th century, economic development occurred. The railway from Brno to Vienna, a school and a hospital were built and a sugar factory was founded.

Demographics

Economy
Hrušovany nad Jevišovkou is known for the sugar factory, which is still in operation. It was founded in 1848. Today it is owned by Agrana conglomerate.

Sights
The parish Church of Saint Stephan is the one of the most valuable monuments. It was built in the late Baroque style in 1758 by plans of the architect Joseph Emanuel Fischer von Erlach. It replaced an old church first mentioned in 1339.

References

External links

Cities and towns in the Czech Republic
Populated places in Znojmo District